Dennis Clarke Fimple (November 11, 1940 – August 23, 2002) was an American actor.

Biography
Fimple was born in Ventura, California, the son of Dolly and Elmer Fimple. He graduated from Taft Union High School in 1958 and received a teaching certificate from San Jose State University, where he majored in Drama.

He appeared in a variety of TV shows including Here Come the Brides, Petticoat Junction, Matt Houston, M*A*S*H, Centennial, Simon & Simon, Highway to Heaven, Sledge Hammer!, Knight Rider, Quantum Leap and ER. He also had roles in films such as Truck Stop Women (1974), The Apple Dumpling Gang (1975), Mackintosh and T.J. (1975), Stay Hungry (1976), King Kong (1976), The Shadow of Chikara (1977), Goin' South (1978), The Wild Women of Chastity Gulch (1982) and Maverick (1994), and shared the lead in Bootleggers (1974) and Creature from Black Lake (1976).

His most popular role was that of the lovable but none-too-bright Devil's Hole Gang member, Kyle Murtry, on the ABC comedy/western series, Alias Smith and Jones, starring Pete Duel and Ben Murphy. Fimple appeared in seven episodes and remains a favorite of fans of the series. In 1993-1994, he appeared as Garral in seven episodes of the Beau Bridges/Lloyd Bridges comedy/western series Harts of the West on CBS. His last role was in the 2003 Rob Zombie horror film House of 1000 Corpses, as the foul-mouthed Grandpa Hugo.

Fimple died in his Frazier Park home on August 23, 2002, where he was recovering from injuries sustained in a car accident four days earlier.

Partial filmography

Summertree (1971) - Shelly
Cactus in the Snow (1971) - Mr. Murray
The Culpepper Cattle Co. (1972) - Wounded Man in Bar
Truck Stop Women (1974) - Curly
The Spectre of Edgar Allan Poe (1974) - Farron
Bootleggers (1974) - Dewey Crenshaw
You and Me (1974)
The Apple Dumpling Gang (1975) - Rudy Hooks
Winterhawk (1975) - Scoby
Mackintosh and T.J. (1975) - Schuster
White House Madness (1975) - Bob Haldeman
Creature from Black Lake (1976) - Pahoo
Stay Hungry (1976) - Bubba
King Kong (1976) - Sunfish
The Shadow of Chikara (1977) - Posey
Goin' South (1978) - Hangman
Smokey and the Good Time Outlaws (1978) - The Salt Flat Kid
They Went That-A-Way & That-A-Way (1978) - Lem
The Evictors (1979) - Mr. Bumford
Swing Shift (1984) - Rupert George
A Summer to Remember (1985) - Smitty (animal feeder)
Body Slam (1986) - Elmo Smithfield
Hawken's Breed (1987) - Crowley
The Giant of Thunder Mountain (1991) - Henderson (Townsman)
My Heroes Have Always Been Cowboys (1991) - Straw Hat
Death Falls (1991) - Griff
Maverick (1994) - Stuttering
Down Periscope (1996) - Fisherman
Bug Buster (1998) - Judediah
Escape to Grizzly Mountain (2000) - Farmer
Fangs (2002) - Willy Kramer
House of 1000 Corpses (2003) - Grampa Hugo (final film role)

References

External links

1940 births
2002 deaths
American male film actors
American male television actors
Male actors from California
People from Taft, California
20th-century American male actors
Road incident deaths in California